Chulung may refer to:

 Chulung glacier, west of map Point NJ9842 on India-Pakistan Actual Ground Position Line (AGPL)
 Chulung language, a Kiranti language spoken in Nepal
 Chulung, a village in Down Meramor, Shahristan District, Daykundi Province, Afghanistan
 Chulung, a village in Lhuntse District, Bhutan

People with the surname
Frank Chulung, candidate of the Australian federal election, 1987